This is a list of railroad stations on the former Ulster and Delaware Railroad and their present-day condition. For more information, see the main article.

Main Line stations

Branch stations

Stony Clove and Kaaterskill Branch

Hunter Branch

Bibliography

References

External links
 Ulster & Delaware Railroad Historical Society
  Ulster & Delaware Railroad
  Railroads of the Catskill Mountains

Ulster and Delaware Railroad
Catskills
Ulster